In telecommunications, an area code split is the practice of introducing a new telephone area code by geographically dividing an existing numbering plan area (NPA), and assigning area codes to the resulting divisions, but retaining the existing area code only for one of the divisions. The purpose of this practice is to provide more central office prefixes, and therefore more telephone numbers, in an area with high demand for telephone services, and prevent a shortage of telephone numbers.

An increasing demand for telephone numbers has existed since the development of automatic telephony in the early 20th century, but was spurred especially since the 1990s, with the proliferation of fax machines, pager systems, mobile telephones, computer modems, and finally smart phones.

When an area code split is implemented, the telephone numbers in the affected area are typically changed to a new area code only, but this still requires the printing of new stationery, advertisements, and signage for many customers, and the dissemination of the new area code to family, friends, and customers. Computer systems, and telephone equipment may require updates in address books, and for speed dialing.

Since area code splits have substantial impact in the involved communities, and involve substantial cost in telephone plant and exchange equipment, they are planned carefully well ahead of implementation with the intent that an area is not again affected by a subsequent realignment for at least a decade.

Furthermore, the new boundaries are drawn in a manner that minimizes splitting communities and should coincide with political subdivision where practical. Other geographic features, such as rivers and bodies of water, mountain ranges, or highways may serve as guides for boundary placements. Tributary toll telephone routes should also not be unduly cut, so prevent rerouting to new toll center switching systems.

The area that retains the existing area code is typically the largest, or historically more established or developed place.

Area code overlays
Not withstanding the desire for long-term stability of the local numbering plan and customer understanding, rapid growth in some areas has resulted in many splits within just a few years.

As a result, in the mid-1990s, the North American Numbering Plan Administrator introduced another method for exhaustion relief, the area code overlay. This method assigns multiple area codes to the same numbering plan area, so that existing subscribers can keep established telephone numbers. Only new accounts and extra lines receive telephone numbers with the new area code. This method requires ten-digit dialing for customers of both area codes, even for local calls. Since 2007, most territories use overlays for mitigating numbering shortages. Most area code relief plans today do not even consider splits as relief options, limiting options to overlay plans.

See also
Flash-cut
Number pooling
Permissive dialing
seven-digit dialing
Telephone exchange

References

Telephone numbers